A war game is a type of strategy game that simulates warfare realistically.

War game, War game, or War Games may also refer to:

Conflict simulations
 Military exercise, a training operation
 Military simulation, a live or computer exercise to develop military strategies
 Wargame (video games), a genre that emphasizes strategic or tactical warfare on a map
 Board wargame, a genre that emphasizes strategic or tactical warfare on a map
 Wargame (hacking), a challenge involving exploiting or defending a computer system vulnerability

Film and television
 The War Game (1962 film), a film by Mai Zetterling
 The War Game, a 1965 BBC television film
 The War Games, a 1969 Doctor Who serial
 WarGames, a 1983 film by John Badham starring Matthew Broderick
 #WarGames, a 2018 interactive film adaptation
 War Game (film), a 2001 animated film based on the 1993 children's novel
 War Games: At the End of the Day, a 2010 film by Cosimo Alemà
 "War Games" (Foyle's War), an episode of Foyle's War
 "War Games" (Space: 1999), an episode of Space: 1999

Literature
 "War Game" (short story), a 1959 short story by Philip K. Dick
 War Game (novel), a 1993 children's novel about World War I
 Batman: War Games, a comic book story arc
 War Games, a 1966 novel by James Park Sloan

Music
 War Games (Grave Digger album) (1986)
 War Games (Rob Swift album) (2005)
 "War Games" (song), a 1983 song by Crosby, Stills & Nash

Professional wrestling
 WarGames match, a professional wrestling match
 NXT TakeOver: WarGames, a professional wrestling event series

Video games
 Wargamer (website), a video game website
 Wargaming (company), a videogame developer and publisher
 WarGames (video game), a 1984 video game for Colecovision
 WarGames: Defcon 1, a 1998 video game for PC and PlayStation
 Wargame: European Escalation, a 2012 real-time strategy game
 Wargame: AirLand Battle, a 2013 real-time strategy game
 Wargame: Red Dragon, a 2014 real-time strategy game
 War Games, a mode in Halo 4 and Halo 5: Guardians

See also
 Business war games, a role-playing exercise set in the world of commerce
 Digimon Adventure: Our War Game!, a 2000 animated film
 A Game of War, a 1987 book about wargaming
 Game of War: Fire Age, a 2013 MMO freemium video game
 Game Wars a 1991 book about fish and game conflicts
 War (card game), a simple card game featuring a series of "battles" between two players
 
 Wargaming (disambiguation)